Króle may refer to the following places:
Króle, Masovian Voivodeship (east-central Poland)
Króle, Warmian-Masurian Voivodeship (north Poland)
Króle, West Pomeranian Voivodeship (north-west Poland)